is a micro-asteroid, classified as near-Earth object of the Aten group, approximately 20 meters in diameter. It was first observed on 3 April 2013, by astronomers of the Mount Lemmon Survey conducted at the Mount Lemmon Observatory near Tucson, Arizona, United States.

The asteroid has only been observed for 12 days. Based on a crude orbit determination, it has an exceptionally low MOID and may approach Earth at one lunar distance on 14 April 2026. Alternative calculations gave a much shorter distance with a possible minimum transit at approximately 8,600 kilometers above Earth's surface.

Orbit and classification 

 is a member of the dynamical Aten group, which are Earth-crossing asteroids and one of the smaller subgroups of near-Earth objects.

It orbits the Sun at a distance of 0.60–1.08 AU once every 9 months (279 days; semi-major axis of 0.84 AU). Its orbit has an eccentricity of 0.29 and an inclination of nearly 0° with respect to the ecliptic. The body's observation arc begins with a precovery taken by DECam at the Chilean Víctor M. Blanco Telescope on 1 April 2013, just two nights prior to its first official observation at Mount Lemmon.

Close approaches 

 has a poorly determined orbit with an uncertainty parameter of 7, due to its short 12-day observation arc. Due to its small size, that is, an absolute magnitude fainter than 22, it is not classified as a potentially hazardous asteroid.

Conversely, Italian astronomers Piero Sicoli and Francesco Manca at the Sormano Astronomical Observatory estimated a close approach with Earth at a nominal distance of 68,420 kilometers and a possible minimum transit at approximately 8,600 kilometers above Earth's surface for that very same date. The two astronomers acknowledge that their orbital computations still contain large uncertainties.

Physical characteristics 

 has not been observed by any of the space-based surveys such as the Infrared Astronomical Satellite IRAS, the Japanese Akari satellite, and NASA's Wide-field Infrared Survey Explorer with its subsequent NEOWISE mission. Based on a generic magnitude-to-diameter conversion,  measures approximately 17 meter in diameter using an absolute magnitude of 26.3 and assuming an albedo of 0.20, which is a typical figure for the common, stony S-type asteroids. Astronomers at the Sormano Astronomical Observatory estimate a similar diameter of 25 meters.

As of 2018, no rotational lightcurve of  has been obtained from photometric observations. The asteroid's rotation period, shape and spin axis remain unknown.

Numbering and naming 

This minor planet has neither been numbered nor named.

References

External links 
 Table of Asteroids Next Closest Approaches to the Earth, Sormano Astronomical Observatory
 Asteroid Lightcurve Database (LCDB), query form (info )
 Asteroids and comets rotation curves, CdR – Observatoire de Genève, Raoul Behrend
 Forthcoming Close Approaches To The Earth – Minor Planet Center
 
 
 

Minor planet object articles (unnumbered)
Discoveries by MLS

20130403